Porto Alegre (Portuguese for "Happy Port") is a village in Caué District on São Tomé Island in São Tomé and Príncipe. Its population is 795 (2012 census). Porto Alegre lies 2.5 km northeast of the southernmost point of São Tomé Island, Ponta Homem da Capa. It is 1.5 km west of Ponta Baleia, 17 km southwest of São João dos Angolares and 40 km southwest of the capital São Tomé.

Across the Canal das Rolas lies the Ilhéu das Rolas.

On the east side of Ponta Homem da Capa is the beach Praia Inhame. The plantation complex Roça de Porto Alegre was established around 1890 by Jacinto Carneiro de Sousa e Almeida. The oldest preserved building dates from 1918.

Population history

Climate
Porto Alegre has a tropical monsoon climate (Am) with heavy to very heavy rainfall in all months except June, July and August.

References

Populated places in Caué District
Populated coastal places in São Tomé and Príncipe